Abdolabad (also Romanized as ‘Abdolābād; also known as ‘Abdābād, ‘Abdolābād-e Behzādī, and ‘Abdollāhābād) is a village in Posht Rud Rural District, in the Central District of Narmashir County, Kerman Province, Iran. At the 2006 census, its population was 111, in 28 families.

References 

Populated places in Narmashir County